Edmo or EDMO may refer to:

 Edmo Cominetti, Argentinian director of films such as Red Blossoms
 Edmo, nickname for Andrew Edmondson (born 1990), an Australian wheelchair rugby champion
 E.D.Mo., an abbreviation for the United States District Court for the Eastern District of Missouri
 Empty dwelling management order
 EDMO, ICAO airport code for Oberpfaffenhofen Airport in Bavaria, Germany